Diegel is a surname. Notable people with the surname include:

Leo Diegel (1899–1951), American golfer
Ralf Diegel (born 1963), German swimmer

See also
Diebel